Järveläinen is a Finnish surname. Notable people with the surname include:

 Joonas Järveläinen (born 1990), Estonian basketball player
 Ville Järveläinen (born 1993), Finnish ice hockey player

Finnish-language surnames